Chen Qingru (December 3, 1926 – 26 May 2021) was a Chinese scientist specializing in mineral processing. He was an academician of the Chinese Academy of Engineering.

Biography
Chen was born in Hangzhou, Zhejiang, on December 3, 1926. In 1948, he was admitted to Tangshan Jiaotong University (now Southwest Jiaotong University), where he majored in the Mining Department. After graduating in September 1952, he joined the faculty of Beijing Institute of Mining and Technology. In December of that same year, he was sent to study at Moscow Institute of Mining at the expense of the Chinese government. He returned to China in December 1960 and continued to teach at Beijing Institute of Mining and Technology. In June 1975, he was transferred to Sichuan Institute of Mining and Technology as deputy director of its Department of Mining Machinery, and held that office until 1980. In September 1980, he moved to China University of Mining and Technology as department head of Coal Comprehensive Utilization System. In January 1987, he became director of the university's Mineral Processing Engineering Research Center. He died of illness in Xuzhou, Jiangsu, on May 26, 2021, aged 94.

Honours and awards
 1995 Member of the Chinese Academy of Engineering (CAE)
 2010 IOC Chairman's Lifetime Achievement Award
 2010 Kentucky Colonelship

References

Bibliography

1926 births
2021 deaths
People from Hangzhou
Engineers from Zhejiang
Southwest Jiaotong University alumni
Members of the Chinese Academy of Engineering